The following is a list of notable East Timorese people:

Marí Alkatiri
Maria Domingas Alves
Francisco Xavier do Amaral
Norberto Do Amaral
Aliança de Araújo
Aicha Bassarewan 
Carlos Felipe Ximenes Belo
Madalena Boavida
Rosa Bonaparte
Maria Ângela Carrascalão
Avelino Coelho
Ilda Conceição
Rosária Corte-Real
Maria de Lourdes Martins Cruz 
Alberto Ricardo da Silva 
Fernando de Araújo
Xanana Gusmão
Eurico Guterres
Francisco Guterres
Nicolau dos Reis Lobato
Martinho da Costa Lopes
Olinda Morais
Basilio do Nascimento
Anna Pessoa Pinto
José Ramos-Horta
Alfredo Reinado
Taur Matan Ruak
Kirsty Sword Gusmão
Fernando Sylvan
Gil da Cruz Trindade
Maria Terezinha Viegas politician
Aurora Ximenes

 People